The second season of Canada's Drag Race premiered on October 14, and concluded on December 16, 2021. The season aired on Crave in Canada and WOW Presents Plus internationally.

Casting for the second season started early 2021 and the twelve contestants were announced on September 14, 2021.

The winner of the second season of Canada’s Drag Race was Icesis Couture, with Kendall Gender and Pythia as runners-up.

Contestants

Ages, names, and cities stated are at time of filming.

Notes:

Contestant progress

Lip syncs
Legend:

Guest judges
In June 2021, new judges for the second season were announced. Brad Goreski, Amanda Brugel, and Traci Melchor replace Stacey McKenzie and Jeffrey Bowyer-Chapman behind the judging table. The season also included several guest judges. Listed in chronological order:
Caitlin Cronenberg, photographer
Hollywood Jade, dancer and choreographer
Fefe Dobson, singer
Connor Jessup, actor
Bif Naked, singer
Gigi Gorgeous, YouTuber and model
Emma Hunter, actress and comedian
Mitsou, singer and actress

Special guests
Episode 2
Thom Allison, actor

Episode 3
Jimbo, contestant on the first season of Canada's Drag Race

Episode 4
Boman "Bomanizer" Martinez-Reid, TikToker and influencer

Episode 10
Priyanka, winner of the first season of Canada's Drag Race
Irvin Washington, assistant choreographer

Episodes

Awards

References

2021 Canadian television seasons
2021 in LGBT history
Canada's Drag Race seasons